Split custody refers to a child custody arrangement in which one parent has sole custody of one or more children while the other parent has sole custody of the remaining siblings. Split custody is rare, as it is thought that it is in the best to keep siblings together for mutual comfort, stability and support. Reasons for split custody can be child preferences for different parents or siblings that do not get along with each other. It is more common for older compared to younger siblings, and then usually at the request of one of the children.

Split custody is different from shared custody, where all children live approximately equal time with each parent in a shared parenting arrangement.

Criticism

One criticism of split custody is the same as for sole custody, in that the children only have one primary parent, which has been shown to cause worse physical, mental and social outcomes versus shared parenting. Split custody has also been criticized for separating siblings and limiting the amount of comfort, support and stability that they can give to each other.

See also
Alternating custody
Bird's nest custody
Child custody
Divorce
Parenting plan
Shared parenting
Sole custody
Third-party custody
The Parent Trap

References

Child custody
Juvenile law
Sibling